Browne-Rafert House, also known as the Rafert-Anderson House and Browne House, is a historic home located in Fortville, Hancock County, Indiana.  It was built in 1914, and is a two-story, Arts and Crafts movement inspired dwelling constructed of Indiana limestone.  It has a hipped roof with wide overhanging eaves.  Also on the property are the contributing carriage house, small utility building originally used as an office, and perimeter fence, gate, and garden features.

It was listed on the National Register of Historic Places in 2015.

References

Houses on the National Register of Historic Places in Indiana
Arts and Crafts architecture in the United States
Houses completed in 1914
Buildings and structures in Hancock County, Indiana
National Register of Historic Places in Hancock County, Indiana